Ambrus Balogh (12 August 1915 – 6 July 1978) was a Hungarian sport shooter who competed at the 1948 Summer Olympics, 1952 Summer Olympics and 1960 Summer Olympics. He won a bronze medal at the 1952 Games.

References

1915 births
1978 deaths
Hungarian male sport shooters
ISSF pistol shooters
Olympic shooters of Hungary
Shooters at the 1948 Summer Olympics
Shooters at the 1952 Summer Olympics
Shooters at the 1960 Summer Olympics
Olympic bronze medalists for Hungary
Olympic medalists in shooting
Medalists at the 1952 Summer Olympics
20th-century Hungarian people